Bibb County School District is the county government agency which operates the public schools in Bibb County, Georgia, United States.

List of schools

Elementary schools
There are 21 elementary schools.
Alexander II Magnet School
Bernd Elementary School
Bruce Elementary School
Burdell-Hunt Magnet School
Carter Elementary School
Hartley Elementary School
Heard Elementary School
Heritage Elementary School
Ingram-Pye Elementary School
Dr. Martin Luther King Jr. Elementary School
Lane Elementary School
Porter Elementary School
John R. Lewis Elementary School, named for U.S. congressman John R. Lewis
Skyview Elementary School
Southfield Elementary School
Springdale Elementary School
Taylor Elementary School
Union Elementary School
Veterans Elementary School
Vineville Academy of the Arts
Williams Elementary School

Middle schools
There are six middle schools.
Appling Middle School
Ballard-Hudson Middle School - built in 1949 after the merger of Ballard High School (originally Lewis High School, established in 1868 by the American Missionary Association) and Hudson High School, a public industrial high school
Howard Middle School
Miller Magnet Middle School
Rutland Middle School
Weaver Middle School

High schools
There are six high schools.
Central High School
 Howard High School
Northeast Magnet High School
Rutland High School
Southwest Magnet High School
Westside High School

Charter schools
Academy for Classical Education (ACE) 
Cirrus Academy  (K-8)

Specialty schools
Elam Alexander Academy
Northwoods Early Childhood Academy

Segregation
Bibb County Schools were segregated, were integrated after court orders, and have been resegregating in recent decades.

References

External links
 

Macon, Georgia

School districts in Georgia (U.S. state)